The women's 70 kilograms (Middleweight) competition at the 2002 Asian Games in Busan, South Korea was held on 1 October at the Gudeok Gymnasium.

Qin Dongya of China won the gold medal.

Schedule
All times are Korea Standard Time (UTC+09:00)

Results

Main bracket

Repechage

References
2002 Asian Games Report, Page 468

External links
 
 Official website

W70
Judo at the Asian Games Women's Middleweight
Asian W70